University College of Applied Sciences (UCAS)  is a  technical college  in Gaza founded in 1998. It offers 40 majors in engineering, health, technology, administration, education and the humanities. The school has a student population of 6,000. The main campus is in Gaza City. Females make up 50% of the student body.  The College offers undergraduate degrees in a number of unique specializations such as education technology, technological management and planning, and geographic information systems.

Undergraduate programs 
 Educational technology
 Technology management
 Geographic Information Systems
 Applied Accounting
 Development planning

Diploma programs 
 Information Technology
 Library Science & Information Management
 Multimedia Technology
 Geographic Information Systems
 Designing and Developing Web Sites
 Databases and Programs
 Administration and Financial Science
 Accounting
 Administration & Office Automation
 Administration & Office Automation
 Sales Representative
 Engineering Professions
 Surveying
 Architecture 
 Interior Design
 Arts & Crafts
 Civil Engineering
 Autotronics Engineering
 Aluminum Technician (Professional Diploma - 1 year)
 Automotive Transmission Technician
 Educational Science
 Early Childhood Education
 Supervision in Childhood Associations
 Physical Education
 Health Professions
 Nursing
 Surgical Technologist
 Medical Secretary
 Midwife Nursing
 Anesthesia and Resuscitation Technologies
 Dentist Assistant
 Humanity Studies
 Islamic Studies (Preachers)
 Public Relations & Advertising
 Social Work
 Secretarial & Legal Studies
 Computer Tech. & Industrial Professions
 Electromech Technician
 Computer Maintenance
 Electronics Instruments Technology
 Internet and Computer Networks
 Science Lab Technologist
 (NEW) Information Security Engineering
 Rehabilitation Science
 Articulation and Speech Problem Therapy
 Community-based Rehabilitation
 Physical Therapy
 Orthotics & Prosthetics

Incubator

UCAS has a start-up  incubator  that supports entrepreneurs in the Gaza Strip. It is a non-profit incubator that is 100% donor-funded with the aim of helping aspiring entrepreneurs turn their ideas into successful businesses.

References

Educational institutions established in 1998
1998 establishments in the Palestinian territories
Universities and colleges in Gaza Strip